"Stop! Don't Tease Me" is a single by DeBarge, released on July 12, 1982 as the first single from their second album, All This Love on the Gordy label. The song eventually reached #46 on the U.S. R&B chart on the week of November 6th, 1982, but did not chart in the Billboard Hot 100.

Charts

Credits
Lead vocals: El DeBarge

References

1982 debut singles
DeBarge songs
Songs written by El DeBarge
1982 songs
Gordy Records singles